D. concinna may refer to:

 Delma concinna, a legless lizard
 Demetrida concinna, a ground beetle
 Derocrania concinna, a ground beetle
 Diminovula concinna, a sea snail
 Discodoris concinna, a sea slug
 Diuris concinna, a herbaceous plant
 Dodonaea concinna, a flowering plant
 Dracaena concinna, a plant used in traditional Chinese medicine
 Dromica concinna, a ground beetle
 Dryandra concinna, a Western Australian shrub
 Ducula concinna, a large pigeon